Back from Eternity is a 1956 American drama film about a planeload of people stranded in the South American jungle and subsequently menaced by headhunters. The film stars Robert Ryan, Rod Steiger, Anita Ekberg and Gene Barry. The film is a remake of the 1939 film Five Came Back, also directed and produced by John Farrow. Richard Carroll, who is credited with writing the story for Back from Eternity, wrote the original story for Five Came Back.

Plot
A Douglas DC-2, from a tiny South American airline, is piloted by Captain Bill Lonagan and co-pilot Joe Brooks, bound for Boca Grande. The passengers are: Jud Ellis, a man of privilege escorting his new fiancée Louise Melhorn; repentant political assassin Vasquel, being transported back to the proper authorities by bounty hunter Crimp; mobster Pete Bostwick, accompanying the son of his boss, Tommy; elderly Professor Spangler, accompanied on a research trip by his wife of 42 years; and prostitute Rena, on her way to work a South American casino.

To Louise's disgust, a local tries to sell Tommy a shrunken head at the airport. During the flight, Vasquel, a self-proclaimed student of people, recounts his precise knowledge of cannibals and how they shrink the heads to the Spanglers. He also taunts Crimp, who reads aloud a newspaper article detailing the murder of Tommy's father before Bostwick stops him and tries to distract the boy.

The aircraft enters a rough storm and is dangerously jostled about, resulting in Crimp losing his revolver. A portable oxygen tank is loosened from its mooring and crashes through one of the fuselage doors. Flight attendant Maria Alvarez plummets to her death while trying to keep Tommy away from the open door. After a fire breaks out in the cockpit, the crew is forced to make an emergency landing at a clearing in the remote jungle.

Tensions soon mount, exacerbated by both their plight and clashing personalities. After first trying to attract Ellis, Rena finds herself drawn to the world weary Lonagan. They form a connection, understanding each other's lot in life; he was a highly regarded pilot on major airlines until turning to drink after his wife died, while she is a post-war displaced person unable to get a passport, taken advantage of by men who pushed her into her profession. The group works to repair the plane while Professor Spangler keeps a journal of their situation.

Crimp tries to take charge of the group, but Vasquel stops him, revealing he has Crimp's revolver – which he gives to Captain Lonagan as the legal authority of the stranded group. Late one night, Crimp renders Bostwick temporarily unconscious, steals the revolver, then flees into the jungle.

Ellis is consistently self-serving, to the disappointment of Louise, who finds herself mutually attracted to the brave and upright co-pilot Brooks. When Ellis gets drunk one night and tries to force himself upon Louise, Brooks stops him. Louise soon finds herself attracted Brooks and suspects the same of Rena. Jealous of Rena, Louise confronts her and the two women, assigned clothes washing duties by Lonagan, have "... a knock-down and drag-out fight" in a nearby stream.

After a fortnight of effort, the aircraft is nearly repaired. Tommy wanders into the jungle but is found by Bostwick and Rena, who discover Crimp's headless body. Rena and Tommy return to camp, but local headhunters kill Bostwick with a poison dart.

Everyone quickly boards the plane, but when Lonagan and Brooks start the engines, they discover an oil leak in one engine. Lonagan patches it, but informs the others that it will not hold long. With only one good engine, the aircraft can carry only five people – Tommy plus four adults – over the mountains.

Everyone but Ellis quickly volunteers to be amongst the four who must stay behind and face the headhunters. With gun in hand, Vasquel takes charge, saying he will stay and will chose the other three via logic. The Spanglers, the most elderly, convince Vasquel they should stay. Vasquel selects Ellis as well, then has to kill him when Ellis grabs for the gun. The aircraft manages to take off.

As the headhunters close in, Vasquel saves the Spanglers from torture by shooting them with the last two bullets, then prays as he awaits a horrible death.

Cast

 Robert Ryan as Bill Lonagan
 Anita Ekberg as Rena
 Rod Steiger as Vasquel
 Phyllis Kirk as Louise Melhorn
 Keith Andes as Joe Brooks
 Gene Barry as Jud Ellis
 Fred Clark as Crimp
 Beulah Bondi as Martha Spangler
 Cameron Prud'Homme as Professor Henry Spangler
 Jesse White as Pete Bostwick
 Adele Mara as Maria Alvarez – Stewardess
 Jon Provost as Tommy Malone
 Tristram Coffin as Paul, Rena's "patron"
 James Burke as Grimsby, Airline Manager
 Tol Avery as Thomas J. Malone
 Joe Gray as Gambler
 Charles Meredith as Dean Simmons
 Harold J. Stone as Dealer
 Marilyn Hanold, uncredited casino showgirl

Cast notes
 Barbara Eden made her screen debut in Back from Eternity, in a minor, uncredited role as a photojournalist

Production
In 1951, RKO producer Sam Wiesenthal hired D. M. Marshman to write a new version of Five Came Back. Marshman was reportedly going to incorporate a recent incident in Rio de Janeiro where a cable car broke down and left people marooned up in the air.

John Farrow agreed to direct a remake as part of a three-picture deal with RKO.

Production began in February 1956 and  principal photography took place from March 5 to April 26.

The fight scene between Kirk and Ekberg required the creation of a stream on the movie's sound set, equipped with running water and foam rubber rocks to avoid injury to the two actresses and seven takes before final filming. Kirk said her and Ekberg were exhausted after the fight.

The supposed New York airport control tower shown near the beginning of the film is actually that of the Lockheed Air Terminal in Burbank, California.

Reception

Despite its earlier notable screen heritage, Back from Eternity did not have a positive review from film critic Bosley Crowther at The New York Times. He said, in part, " ... the plight of a group of people downed in the South American wilds when the airliner in which they are traveling is forced to crash land by a violent thunderstorm ... This is the undistinguished company, and we hasten to advise that nothing that happens to them is either inspired or interesting. "

See also
 List of American films of 1956
 Survival films

References
Informational notes

Citations

Bibliography
 Pendo, Stephen (1985) Aviation in the Cinema. Lanham, Maryland: Scarecrow Press. .

External links
 
 
 
 
 

1956 films
American drama films
American aviation films
American black-and-white films
1956 drama films
Remakes of American films
Films scored by Franz Waxman
Films directed by John Farrow
RKO Pictures films
Films about aviation accidents or incidents
1950s English-language films
1950s American films